Habitat selection hypothesis is one of several hypotheses that attempt to explain the mechanisms of brood parasite host selection in cuckoos. Cuckoos are not the only brood parasites, however the behavior is more rare in other groups of birds, including ducks, weavers, and cowbirds.

Brood parasites and their favored host species are known to coevolve, which means both are likely to possess specific adaptations and counteradaptations. An example of such an evolutionary arms race between a brood parasite and its host, is the phenomenon of egg rejection and egg mimicry, its counteradaptation. Cuckoo eggs have been found in the nests of over 100 different species, of which 11 have been identified as primary host species and a similar number as secondary. Egg patterns and coloring differs greatly between these host species, and the cuckoo eggs vary accordingly. Thus it is important for a female cuckoo to deposit her eggs in a nest corresponding to the same species as her foster parents, because if she were to select a different host species, that would likely entail a higher risk of egg rejection.

According to the habitat selection hypothesis, host selection occurs through the means of habitat imprinting in early post-natal development. A female cuckoo retains recognition of certain stimuli, like vegetation, from experience with her natal habitat. Habitats might be defined as dry or wet, shrubby or forested, lakeside, etc. This process has been termed natal habitat preference induction (NHPI) and has been found in many species across different taxa, such as insects (Hopkins’ host selection principle), fish, amphibians, mammals and birds of course. This imprinting of the habitat type in which the female cuckoo was reared may cause her to subsequently return to this habitat type in order to lay eggs and therefore increases the likelihood of encountering the suitable host species, as most host species are known to be habitat specific. Thus, habitat selection is thought to allow for specific host selection by the female cuckoo. In some cases an individual may choose a different habitat from their original imprint based on the reproductive success of  conspecific individuals in the vicinity.

Alternative Hypotheses 
There are 5 hypotheses for host selection in cuckoos: Inherited preference, host imprinting, natal philopatry (returning to their own birthplace to lay eggs), nest site choice (preference based on egg and nest similarity), and the hypothesis described above, habitat selection. Although the preponderance of evidence seems to be in favor of the habitat selection hypothesis, some evidence for natal philopatry has been observed in cuckoos and the majority of cuckoo eggs are found in nests and among eggs matching their foster species, which supports the nest site choice hypothesis, but does not invalidate any of the other hypotheses. It could also be the case that there is more than one mechanism of host selection at play here. In their 1997 study, Teuschl et al. suggest the possibility of a hierarchal decision process consisting of 3 steps: 1) upon returning from their spring migration the female cuckoos go back to the approximate location of their birthplace, which should increase the likelihood of them finding a familiar habitat, 2) choosing a suitable habitat based on habitat imprinting, 3) choosing a suitable nest within that habitat.

References

Behavioral ecology